7-Chlorokynurenic acid (7-CKA) is a tool compound that acts as a potent and selective competitive antagonist of the glycine site of the NMDA receptor. It produces ketamine-like rapid antidepressant effects in animal models of depression. However, 7-CKA is unable to cross the blood-brain-barrier, and for this reason, is unsuitable for clinical use. As a result, a centrally-penetrant prodrug of 7-CKA, 4-chlorokynurenine (AV-101), has been developed for use in humans, and is being studied in clinical trials as a potential treatment for major depressive disorder, and anti-nociception. In addition to antagonizing the NMDA receptor, 7-CKA also acts as a potent inhibitor of the reuptake of glutamate into synaptic vesicles (or as a vesicular glutamate reuptake inhibitor), an action that it mediates via competitive blockade of vesicular glutamate transporters (Ki = 0.59 mM).

See also
 5,7-Dichlorokynurenic acid
 Evans blue
 Kynurenic acid
 Xanthurenic acid

References

Chloroarenes
4-Quinolones
Excitatory amino acid reuptake inhibitors
Reagents for biochemistry
Biological techniques and tools
Enoic acids